Berezovo is a rural locality (a village) in Nizhneyerogodskoye Rural Settlement, Velikoustyugsky District, Vologda Oblast, Russia. The population was 24 as of 2002.

Geography 
Berezovo is located 47 km southwest of Veliky Ustyug (the district's administrative centre) by road. Bolshoye Vostroye is the nearest rural locality.

References 

Rural localities in Velikoustyugsky District